is a former Japanese football player and currently the manager of Kochi United SC.

Playing career
Yoshimoto was born in Kochi Prefecture on May 13, 1978. After graduating from Fukuoka University, he joined J1 League club Nagoya Grampus Eight in 2001. On November 17, he debuted as substitute center back from the 89th minute against JEF United Ichihara. However he could only play this match at the club. In June 2002, he moved to J2 League club Yokohama FC. He played many matches as center back with Shinya Sakoi. In 2003, he moved to J2 club Mito HollyHock. He became a regular player as center back and played many matches until 2007. In 2008, he moved to J2 club Yokohama FC again. Although he played many matches, he could not become a regular player and retired end of 2009 season. In 2012, he signed with Prefectural Leagues club Blancdieu Hirosaki FC and became a player manager. He played many matches as regular player and the club was promoted to Regional Leagues from 2013. He retired end of 2017 season.

Coaching career
In 2012, Yoshimoto signed with Prefectural Leagues club Blancdieu Hirosaki FC and became a player manager. The club was promoted to Regional Leagues from 2013. He managed the club until end of 2017 season. In 2020, he was assistant manager of his hometown club, Kochi United SC. In 2022, he was promoted from assistant manager to manager of his hometown club Kochi United SC.

Club statistics

Managerial statistics
.

Honours

Manager
 Blancdieu Hirosaki
 Aomori Prefecture 1st Division : 2012
 Tohoku Soccer League Div. 2 : 2014

References

External links

1978 births
Living people
Fukuoka University alumni
Association football people from Kōchi Prefecture
Japanese footballers
J1 League players
J2 League players
Nagoya Grampus players
Yokohama FC players
Mito HollyHock players
Japanese football managers
Association football defenders